Microsoft Publisher is a desktop publishing application from Microsoft, differing from Microsoft Word in that the emphasis is placed on page layout and graphic design rather than text composition and proofreading.

Overview
Publisher is included in higher-end editions of Microsoft Office, reflecting Microsoft's emphasis on the application as an easy-to-use and less expensive alternative to the "heavyweights" with a focus on the small-business market, where firms do not have dedicated design professionals available to make marketing materials and other documents. However, it has a relatively small share of the desktop publishing market, which is dominated by Adobe InDesign and formerly by QuarkXPress.

While most Microsoft Office apps adopted ribbons for their user interface starting with Microsoft Office 2007, Publisher retained its toolbars and did not adopt ribbons until Microsoft Office 2010.

Compatibility
LibreOffice has supported Publisher's proprietary file format (.pub) since February 2013. Corel Draw X4 features read-only support. 

Publisher supports numerous other file formats, including the Enhanced Metafile (EMF) format, which is supported on Windows platforms. The Microsoft Publisher trial version can be used to view .pub files beyond the trial period.

Adobe PageMaker also saved files with a .pub extension, but the two file formats were unrelated and incompatible.

Release history

See also
 Ventura Publisher, the first popular desktop publishing package for IBM PC compatible computers
 Timeworks Publisher (a major competitor in the marketplace in the early 1990s)

References

External links 
 
 Microsoft Publisher blog (last updated December 2009) on MSDN Blogs 

Desktop publishing software
Publisher
Products introduced in 1991